Nordre Vartdal is a village in the Vartdal area of the municipality of Ørsta, Møre og Romsdal, Norway. The village sits at the entrance to the Ådalen valley, at the mouth of the Storelva river. The European route E39 highway runs through Nordre Vartdal, right past Vartdal Church, which sits on the shore of the fjord.

References

Villages in Møre og Romsdal
Ørsta